Gwenllian Gill (1915–2004) was a British film actress. After originally appearing in some films in Hollywood she returned to Britain to appear in leading roles in several quota quickies.

Selected filmography
 Shock (1934)
 Behold My Wife! (1934)
 Come On, Marines! (1934)
 Menace (1934)
 Father Brown, Detective (1934)
 The White Lilac (1935)
 Flame in the Heather (1935)
 Irish and Proud of It (1936)
 King of Hearts (1936)
 False Evidence (1937)
 Murder Tomorrow (1938)
 Midnight Lace (1960)

References

Bibliography
 Goble, Alan. The Complete Index to Literary Sources in Film. Walter de Gruyter, 1999.

External links

1915 births
2004 deaths
British film actresses
People from Hartlepool
British expatriate actresses in the United States